Gethyllis spiralis, commonly called Koekmakranka, is a bulbous plant endemic to the Sandveld of the Cape Province of South Africa. It is much sought after for its enticingly scented fruit that it bears underground. It is recognisable by its spiralling grey-green strap-like leaves.

References

External links
photo of herbarium specimen at Missouri Botanical Garden, Gethyllis spiralis

Amaryllidoideae
Plants described in 1776
Flora of the Cape Provinces